Bernt Arne Lynge (9 July 1884 – 28 January 1942) was a Norwegian botanist. He specialized in lichen, in particular species from the Arctic and Antarctica.

Lynge was born at Lyngør in Aust-Agder, Norway. After graduation, he was employed as an assistant in the University of Oslo  Botanical Garden and later curator at the Natural History Museum at the University of Oslo. He was appointed professor of botany at the University of Oslo from 1935. Lynge was elected to the Norwegian Academy of Science.  His publications included Studies on the Lichen Flora of Norway (1921) and  Vascular Plants from Novaya Semlyen (1923).
The Spitsbergen glacier Lyngebreen is named after him.

See also
 :Category:Taxa named by Bernt Arne Lynge

References

1884 births
1942 deaths
People from Tvedestrand
20th-century Norwegian botanists
Academic staff of the University of Oslo
Norwegian lichenologists